The 2017 São Tomé and Principe Championship was the 32nd season of the São Tomé and Principe Championship the top-level football championship of São Tomé and Principe.

There are two separate championships, one for teams of São Tomé Island and one for teams of Príncipe Island. The champions of the two island championships play a home-and-away two-legged final to decide the overall champions.

São Tomé teams 2017

First Division

Second Division

Third Division

The third division featured 10 clubs.

Final table

-.Juba de Diogo Simão    withdrew

Both Ototó (1st) and Cruz Vermelha (2nd) will be promoted into the Second Division in the following season.

Príncipe Championship

A total of 6 teams participate in the Príncipe Island League. Os Operários won their championship title for Príncipe and qualified into the national championship matches.

Final table

National final
The two match finals took place. on 19 and 26 November. The qualified teams were:
Champions of São Tomé: UDRA
Champions of Príncipe: Os Operários

UDRA won all two legs, first 2-0 in São Tomé Island, then 1-3 in Príncipe and UDRA won their second national championship title. By district, Caué's total honours won in the championships also became two, superseded Cantagalo's single title and became third out of fifth, tied with Lobata, all won by Desportivo de Guadalupe.

Also UDRA became entrant into the national super cup and qualify as champion.

Results
First Leg [Nov 19, Estádio Nacional 12 de Julho, São Tomé]

UDRA             2-0 Operários

[Janine 34, 37]

Second Leg [Nov 26, Estádio Regional 13 de Junho, Santo António]

Operários        1-3 UDRA

[Cáte 22; Tavarinho 7, Janine 54, Vando 56]

References

Football competitions in São Tomé and Príncipe
Sao Tome and Principe
Championship